The 1935 National League Division One was the seventh season of motorcycle speedway in Great Britain.

Summary
Walthamstow relocated to Hackney Wick Wolves. Plymouth Devils and Birmingham dropped out so there were only 7 teams, 6 of which were located in London. Bluey Wilkinson of West Ham Hammers topped the rider averages.

The only non-London club, Belle Vue Aces, won their third consecutive national title and Knockout Cup and second treble after winning the A.C.U Cup.

British champion Tom Farndon of the New Cross Lambs was fatally injured in a scratch race at New Cross Stadium, on 28 August. He was involved in a crash with Ron Johnson, who clipped the safety fence and fell causing Farndon to crash into Johnson's bike. Farndon suffered a fractured skull and spine injury and was unconscious when he was transferred to the Miller General Hospital in Greenwich. He died two days later on 30 August.

Final table

Top Ten Riders

National Trophy
The 1935 National Trophy was the fifth edition of the Knockout Cup.

First round

Semifinals

Final

First leg

Second leg

Belle Vue were National Trophy Champions, winning on aggregate 126-88.

A.C.U Cup
The 1935 Auto-Cycle Union Cup was the second edition of the Cup and was won by Belle Vue for the second time.

First round
Group 1

Group 2

Final

See also
List of United Kingdom Speedway League Champions
Knockout Cup (speedway)

References

Speedway National League
1935 in speedway
1935 in British motorsport